Andrew Gibb Maitland (30 November 1864 – 27 January 1951)  was an English-born Australian geologist.

Maitland was born in Birkby, Yorkshire, England and studied civil engineering at Yorkshire College of Science, Leeds where he was influenced by the professor of geology Alexander Henry Green.

In 1888 he was assigned Second Assistant Geologist to the Geological Survey of Queensland. Maitland reported to Robert Logan Jack who assigned him to survey the land in the Mackay region. In 1891 he was seconded by Sir William MacGregor on the Geological examination of British New Guinea.

From 1896 to 1926 he was the Government Geologist in Western Australia, in 1898 he published Bibliography of the Geology of Western Australia. In 1901 he served as geologist on Drake-Brockman's expedition to the Kimberley.

In 1924 he was awarded the ANZAAS Mueller Medal, in 1927 he was awarded the Clarke Medal by the Royal Society of New South Wales.

He died in Subiaco, Western Australia and was buried in the Anglican section of Karrakatta Cemetery. Gibb River and Maitland Range, in the Kimberley division, commemorate Maitland and recall that he was generally known as Gibb Maitland.

Gibb Maitland's contributions to the study of geology in Western Australia is commemorated by the Gibb Maitland Medal, usually awarded annually by the Western Australian Division of the Geological Society of Australia for substantial contributions to geoscience in Western Australia, with particular consideration given to contributions that relate to the occurrence or discovery of mineral resources.

References
Maitland, Andrew Gibb (1864 - 1951) at Bright Sparcs, Melbourne University
T. G. Vallance, 'Maitland, Andrew Gibb (1864 - 1951)', Australian Dictionary of Biography, Volume 10, MUP, 1986, pp 386–387.
The Gibb Maitland Medal

1864 births
1951 deaths
Australian geologists
Australian people of English descent
Scientists from Western Australia
Burials at Karrakatta Cemetery
19th-century Australian scientists
20th-century Australian scientists